Follas novas (New Leaves) is a collection of poetry by the Galician Rosalía de Castro, published in 1880. It is her second and last collection in the Galician language. The majority of the poems were written during 1869-1870, when the family lived in Simancas, but the collection also includes literary work from the 1870s, part of which had already been published in newspapers.  This book is considered one of the fundamental works of Galician literature, which triggered the Galician Rexurdimento.

Follas novas is considered to be the highlight of Castro's career. It also represents a transitional phase between her first Galician collection Cantares gallegos (1863) and the radical novel  written in Castilian Spanish. In addition to romantic poetry, Follas novas contains social comments about the role of women and Galician emigration for economical reasons. The last book of the collection,  (Widows of the living and widows of the dead) is about women whose husbands left the country for economical reasons. In the preface, Castro explains that the publication and distribution of the collection was supported by the Galician community in Cuba.

References 

Spanish books
Spanish poetry
Galician literature
1880 books

Additional reading
 Kirsti Hooper: Writing Galicia Into the World: New Cartographies, New Poetics, s. 150. Liverpool University Press, 2011. .